Sun Chao (born 8 January 1987) is a Chinese race walker.

Achievements

References

1987 births
Living people
Chinese male racewalkers